Edwin Benedict Dooley (April 13, 1905 – January 25, 1982) was a Republican member of the United States House of Representatives from New York.

Early life
Edwin B. "Eddie" Dooley was born in Brooklyn, New York, on April 13, 1905. He graduated from Dartmouth College in 1927, and was an All American as quarterback of the football team. He graduated from Fordham University School of Law in 1930.

Start of career
Dooley was a feature writer on sports for the New York Sun from 1927 until 1938, and was a radio sports broadcaster in New York City from 1936 to 1948. From 1938 to 1955 Dooley pursued a career as a public relations executive for General Foods.

During World War II Dooley served as a member of committees on food production and distribution for the War and Navy departments.

Political career
Dooley was a trustee of the village of Mamaroneck from 1942 to 1946, and mayor from 1951 until 1956.

In 1956 Dooley was a successful candidate for the United States House. He was reelected in 1958 and 1960, and served from January 3, 1957, until January 3, 1963. He was an unsuccessful candidate for renomination in 1962. Dooley voted in favor of the civil rights acts of 1957 and 1960, but voted present on the 24th Amendment to ban poll taxes.

Post-Congressional career
After leaving Congress, Dooley returned to his career in public relations and worked as a lobbyist in Washington, D.C. From 1966 to 1975 he served as chairman of the New York State Athletic Commission. In this role, he generated controversy when he suspended the boxing license of Muhammad Ali for refusing to be drafted into the Army. In 1972, he changed the policy on access for women sports journalists, permitting them to occupy seats reserved for the press and to enter dressing rooms provided that male athletes were properly attired.

Death and burial
He died in Boca Raton, Florida, on January 25, 1982. He was cremated, and his ashes were scattered at the family grave site in Hawthorne's Gate of Heaven Cemetery.

Family
Dooley met his first wife, Harriette M. Feeley of Norwich, Vermont, while they were in college, and they married in 1926. After her death in 1952 he married Anita M. Gilles, who died in 1962. His third wife, Margaret Sheffel, survived him, as did his son, Edwin B. Dooley Jr. (1933-2008).

References

Sources

1905 births
1982 deaths
Dartmouth College alumni
All-American college football players
Fordham University School of Law alumni
Journalists from New York (state)
Radio personalities from New York City
American public relations people
Mayors of places in New York (state)
Republican Party members of the United States House of Representatives from New York (state)
20th-century American non-fiction writers
Sportspeople from Brooklyn
Players of American football from New York City
20th-century American politicians
20th-century American journalists
American male journalists
20th-century American male writers
New York State Athletic Commissioners